Nien Ching-yun (born 18 February 2002) is a Taiwanese footballer who plays as a midfielder for Taiwan Mulan Football League club Taichung Blue Whale and the Chinese Taipei women's national team.

References

2002 births
Living people
Women's association football midfielders
Taiwanese women's footballers
Chinese Taipei women's international footballers